James Dement "Big James" Weaver (November 25, 1903 – December 12, 1983) was an American Major League Baseball pitcher with the Washington Senators, New York Yankees, St. Louis Browns, Chicago Cubs, Pittsburgh Pirates and the Cincinnati Reds between 1928 and 1939. He batted and threw right-handed.

Over the course of his 12-year MLB career, Weaver compiled a 57–36 win–loss record, a 3.88 ERA, striking out 449 while walking 336. His only ejection came on June 21, 1936, for singing in the dugout, annoying umpire Beans Reardon, with whom he had an argument the game before.

Weaver was born in Obion County, Tennessee, and died in Lakeland, Florida.

References

External links

1903 births
1983 deaths
Major League Baseball pitchers
Baseball players from Tennessee
Washington Senators (1901–1960) players
Chicago Cubs players
New York Yankees players
St. Louis Browns players
Western Kentucky Hilltoppers baseball players
Pittsburgh Pirates players
Cincinnati Reds players
People from Obion County, Tennessee